These lists of Liberty ships are sortable lists, allowing ships to be looked up by hull number. Liberty ships were a type of mass-produced cargo ship built to meet inexpensively the United States's World War II maritime transport needs.

List of Liberty ships (A–F)
List of Liberty ships (G–Je)
List of Liberty ships (Je–L)
List of Liberty ships (M–R)
List of Liberty ships (S–Z)

See also
 List of United States Navy ships
 List of Royal Navy ships
 List of ships of the Imperial Japanese Navy
 List of U.S. military vessels named after living Americans
 List of U.S. military vessels named after women

Merchant ships of the United States